This is a list of members of the 47th Legislative Assembly of Queensland from 1992 to 1995, as elected at the 1992 state election held on 19 September 1992.

 On 31 March 1994, the National member for Mirani, Jim Randell, resigned. National candidate Ted Malone won the resulting by-election on 30 April 1994.

See also
1992 Queensland state election
Goss Ministry (Labor) (1989–1996)

References

Members of Queensland parliaments by term
20th-century Australian politicians